SBSE may refer to:
 Search-based software engineering
 Stir bar sorptive extraction